Cambarus angularis, the angled crayfish, is a species of crayfish in the family Cambaridae found in Tennessee and Virginia.

References

External links

Cambaridae
Freshwater crustaceans of North America
Crustaceans described in 1964
Taxa named by Horton H. Hobbs Jr.